Loretta Maxine Schrijver (born 16 May 1956 in New York City) is a Dutch television host.

Schrijver started working for television after finishing her studies History and Translation Science, after which she became a famous television personality. She was a news anchor for RTL Nieuws on RTL 4 from 1989 until 2000 and again from 2001 until 2007, presenting alongside Jeroen Pauw among others. In 2000 she exchanged RTL 4 for the AVRO and co-hosted the television program Alle dieren tellen mee (All animals count). After working there for a year she decided that public broadcasting didn't suit her and she returned to the RTL News.

In 2005 she was acclaimed the most popular news anchor in the Netherlands in a survey.

Since 2019 is Schrijver a jury member by the Dutch version of The Masked Singer.

Private
In an interview with the NCRV in May 2001, Loretta Schrijver, whose Jewish father survived the Holocaust, clearly distances herself from the position of victim society tends to put her in because of her family history.

References

1956 births
Living people
Dutch journalists
Dutch people of Jewish descent
Dutch television news presenters
Dutch television presenters
Television personalities from New York City